Little Bullhead is an unincorporated community in northern Manitoba, Canada.

References  

Localities in Manitoba

Unincorporated communities in Northern Region, Manitoba